Khulumani FM, also known as KFM95.0 is a provincial radio station that broadcasts from the metropolitan province of Bulawayo in Matabeleland region. It was launched on March 2, 2018 to cater for the audiences in the province and surrounding areas within a 60 km radius. The station is based in ZBC's Montrose Studios in Bulawayo.

The station was positively welcomed by Bulawayo residents, artists and businesses as an additional flavour to complement the commercial radio station Skyz Metro FM in the same city. It broadcasts in 7 languages namely English, Ndebele, Xhosa, Kalanga, Venda, Sotho and Tonga.

The station is fully owned, operated and controlled by the state broadcaster and is not a community radio station. It is, however, fully focused on informing, entertaining and educating the communities in Bulawayo and Matabeleland region. Being a state controlled, this means that the station's news reports and current affairs are not fully impartial.

The station has gained a huge following since launch and most of its programming is informative, with notable highly interactive talk shows. The news bulletins are broadcast in 6 languages of the region and predominantly in English.

The music playlist is predominantly, but not exclusively, Nguni from Matabeleland region, South Africa and Eswatini. The station aims to promote local artists within the region. Music from across Africa and the rest of the world, especially pop, RnB, country and reggae is also included on most of the station's playlists.

References

External links

Radio stations in Zimbabwe